Ashoke Viswanathan (also Asoke, born in 1959) is a Bengali Indian filmmaker and theatre personality, based in Kolkata, India.

Personal life
Viswanathan is the son of actor N. Viswanathan. He is a Mathematics graduate from St. Xavier's College, Kolkata and a graduate in film direction from the Film and Television Institute of India.
He is married to Madhumanti Maitra, a lecturer at a girls' college and an anchor. He has a daughter, Anusha, who is an actor.

Career
Viswanathan is currently a Professor and Head of Department of Producing For Film and TV specialisation and Dean (Film Wing)  at Satyajit Ray Film and Television Institute and an occasional lecturer at Jadavpur University.

He has made award-winning features and documentaries, such as 2014's "The Lighthouse, The Ocean and The Sea", an exploration of the intellectual relationships between Rabindranath Tagore, Romain Rolland and Kalidas Nag. Two of Viswanathan's films have won national awards: his debut film "Shunya Theke Shuru" and "Kichu Sanglap Kichu Prolap"

He has also directed commercial films like "Sesh Sanghat", starring mainstream actors Jaya Prada and Jackie Shroff, and "Gumshuda" in Hindi, Malayalam and Tamil ("Vaira Kolaigal"), a whodunit based on Sherlock Holmes, targeted at a mass audience.

He has served as the Chairperson of the Jury for non-feature films for the National Film Awards.

Three of his feature films and two of his short features have been included in the INDIAN PANORAMA sections of IFFI '94, 1999, 2001, 2002 and 2005. His films have been shown at the Commonwealth Film Festival, Manchester, the Pyongyang International Film Festival, the Dhaka International Film Festival, and the Ipswich Film Festival, among others.

Viswanathan has represented India at the Cambridge Seminar on contemporary British writing, held at Downing College, Cambridge (1997).

Filmography

Awards
 Indira Gandhi Award for Best Debut Film of a Director, 1993, for Shunya Theke Shuru.
 National Film Award – Special Jury Award, 1998, for Kichhhu Sanlap Kichhu Pralap.

References

External links

 

1959 births
Living people
Film directors from Kolkata
Bengali film directors
Director whose film won the Best Debut Feature Film National Film Award